Gliozzi Peak is a peak,  high, standing  south of Plummer Glacier in the Douglas Peaks of the Heritage Range, Antarctica. It was named by the Advisory Committee on Antarctic Names for James Gliozzi, a glaciologist on the United States Antarctic Research Program South Pole—Queen Maud Land Traverse I of 1964–65.

See also
 Mountains in Antarctica

References

Mountains of Ellsworth Land